Huysman's Pets is a novel by Kate Wilhelm published in 1986.

Plot summary
Huysman's Pets is a novel in which experimental animal children have been produced by deceased geneticist Huysman.

Reception
Dave Langford reviewed Huysman's Pets for White Dwarf #86, and stated that "The forces of injustice are defeated by ham acting, telepathy, computer hacking and forged dollars, all very quickly and quietly. Nice reading, but more suspense and genuine nastiness would have made a stronger book."

Reviews
Review by Larry D. Woods (1986) in Fantasy Review, February 1986
Review by Debbie Notkin (1986) in Locus, #301 February 1986
Review by E. F. Bleiler (1986) in Rod Serling's The Twilight Zone Magazine, June 1986
Review by Tom Easton (1986) in Analog Science Fiction/Science Fact, July 1986
Review by Don D'Ammassa (1986) in Science Fiction Chronicle, #85 October 1986
Review by Tom Jones (1987) in Vector 137
Review by Lee Montgomerie (1987) in Interzone, #19 Spring 1987

References

1986 novels